Coelophysidae is a family of primitive carnivorous theropod dinosaurs. Most species were relatively small in size. The family flourished in the Late Triassic and Early Jurassic periods, and has been found on numerous continents. Many members of Coelophysidae are characterized by long, slender skulls and light skeletons built for speed. One member genus, Coelophysis, displays the earliest known furcula in a dinosaur.

Under cladistic analysis, Coelophysidae was first defined by Paul Sereno in 1998 as the most recent common ancestor of Coelophysis bauri and Procompsognathus triassicus, and all of that common ancestor's descendants. However, Tykoski (2005) has advocated for the definition to change to include the additional taxa of "Syntarsus" kayentakatae and Segisaurus halli. Coelophysidae is part of the superfamily Coelophysoidea, which in turn is a subset of the larger Neotheropoda clade. As part of Coelophysoidea, Coelophysidae is often placed as sister to the Dilophosauridae family, however, the monophyly of this clade has often been disputed. The older term "Podokesauridae", named 14 years prior to Coelophysidae (which would normally grant it priority), is now usually ignored, since its type specimen was destroyed in a fire and can no longer be compared to new finds.

Classification

Characteristics 
Coelophysids are characterized by slender, skinny builds and long, narrow skulls with large fenestrae to allow for a lighter skull. They are fairly primitive theropods, and so have fairly basal characteristics, such as hollow air sacs in the cervical vertebrae and obligate bipedalism. Their slender builds allowed them to be fast and agile runners. All known members of Coelophysidae are carnivores. One species, Coelophysis bauri has the oldest known furcula (wishbone) of any dinosaur.

It has also been speculated that some species within Coelophysidae, namely Coelophysis bauri, displayed cannibalism, although the fossil evidence behind these claims has been heavily debated (Rinehart et al., 2009; Gay, 2002; Gay, 2010).

Phylogenetics
Coelophysidae is part of the larger superfamily of Coelophysoidea, which contains Dilophosauridae, Liliensternus, and Zupaysaurus in addition to Coelophysidae. Coelophysoidea, in turn, is part of the larger clade of Neotheropoda.

The cladogram below was recovered in a study by Matthew T. Carrano, John R. Hutchinson and Scott D. Sampson, 2005.

The cladogram below follows the topology from a 2011 analysis by paleontologists Martin D. Ezcurra and Stephen L. Brusatte, modified with additional data by You Hai-Lu and colleagues in 2014.

This cladogram follows the 2017 analysis by Ezcurra, with added results of the Martinez & Apaldetti analysis from their description of Lucianovenator.

Biogeography 
Fossils of members of Coelophysidae have been found across many continents, including North America, South America, Europe, Asia, and Africa. Powellvenator podocitus was discovered in Northwestern Argentina. Procompsognathus triassicus was discovered in Germany, and Camposaurus arizonensis is from Arizona in North America. No coelophysid fossils were known from Asia until the discovery of Panguraptor lufengensis in 2014 in the Yunnan Province of China. The genus Coelophysis has been found in North America, South Africa, and Zimbabwe.

See also

 Timeline of coelophysoid research
Coelophysoidea
Coelophysis bauri

References

Late Triassic dinosaurs
Early Jurassic dinosaurs
Prehistoric dinosaur families
Late Triassic first appearances
Early Jurassic extinctions